West Yangoru Rural LLG is a local-level government (LLG) of East Sepik Province, Papua New Guinea.

Wards
01. Kumun
02. Kumbuhun
03. Wihun (Boinam)
04. Himbruolye/Buki
05. Alisu
06. Bonahitam
07. Koboibus
08. Yabamunu
09. Kuragumun
10. Bukitu
11. Wingei 1
12. Wingei 2
13. Bepandu
14. Yekingen & Belmo
15. Sara
16. Holik
17. Nindibolye
18. Kwaian
19. Duningi
20. Miambauru
21. Nambari
22. Malapaem
23. Ilipaem
24. Guningi
25. Nimbihu

References

Local-level governments of East Sepik Province